Before the Frost is a 2018 Danish drama film directed by Michael Noer. It was screened in the Contemporary World Cinema section at the 2018 Toronto International Film Festival.

Cast
 Jesper Christensen as Jens
 Magnus Krepper as Gustav
 Gustav Dyekjær Giese as Laurits
 Elliott Crosset Hove as Peder
 Clara Rosager as Signe
  as Holger

References

External links
 

2018 films
2018 drama films
Danish drama films
2010s Danish-language films
Films directed by Michael Noer